Michael Dattilo Rubbo (born 31 December 1938) is an Australian documentarian/filmmaker.

Early life
Rubbo was born in Melbourne, the son of Australian microbiologist Sydney Dattilo Rubbo, and the grandson of the painter Antonio Dattilo Rubbo. He is one of four children and the brother of artist Kiffy Rubbo (1944–1980). He attended the private Scotch College, and studied anthropology at Sydney University. He earned a Fulbright scholarship to study film at Stanford University, California; in 1965, he graduated with a Master's degree in Communication Arts.

Career
Rubbo approached the National Film Board of Canada about an internship, but they were so impressed by his thesis film, The True Source of Knowledge, they hired him to make films, initially for children. He spent the next 20 years there, as a director, writer, editor and/or producer, mainly of serious films. At the time, the NFB was encouraging an objective approach to non-fiction film, including the use of voice-of-God narration, but Rubbo became an early pioneer in the field of metafilm, creating subjective, highly personal films that were more like personal journals than objective records of reality. His best-known NFB films are Sad Song of Yellow Skin (1972)), Waiting for Fidel (1973), Wet Earth and Warm people, and Margaret Atwood: Once in August (1984).

In between films, Rubbo taught at Australia's |National Film School, and was a visiting lecturer at New York University, UCLA, Stanford University, the University of Florida, Harvard University and the Australian Film, Television and Radio School. In 1973, he helped re-establish Film Australia. His work has inspired numerous filmmakers, notably Michael Moore, Nick Broomfield, Louis Theroux, Tina DiFeliciantonio and Karen Goodman.

In 1990, he returned to Australia to take the position of Head of Documentaries at the Australian Broadcasting Corporation. 

Rubbo's films have won numerous awards. They have been widely shown on TV and are in the collections of the Museum of Modern Art (MOMA) and film schools around the world. His films are among the most-screened in the history of the Sydney Film Festival.

Rubbo has also directed and written four children's feature films including The Peanut Butter Solution (1985), Tommy Tricker and the Stamp Traveller (1988), The Return of Tommy Tricker (1994), and the Daytime Emmy award-winning film Vincent and Me (1990).

In 2017, he published the book Travels with My Art.

Personal life
Rubbo and his wife Katerina, a Russian interpreter, teacher and artist, have two grown children and live in Avoca Beach, New South Wales.

In 2013, the BBC named the Avoca Beach Theatre as one of the 10 most beautiful cinemas in the world. Rubbo spearheaded the campaign to stop plans to redevelop the theatre; it is now owned, and protected, by the National Trust of Australia. Rubbo is also a prominent advocate for the widespread use of bicycles.

Rubbo has been active in the defense of Julian Assange He was also among a group of people who helped to secure the release of the filmmaker James Ricketson, who was wrongfully held in prison in Cambodia.

Filmography

The True Source of Knowledge - documentary short, Stanford University 1965 - director 
The Long Haul Men - documentary short 1966  - director
Labour College - documentary short, Mort Ransen,  National Film Board of Canada 1966 - writer
The Bear and the Mouse - documentary short, F.W. Remmler & Ingmar Remmler National Film Board of Canada 1966- editor
That Mouse - short film, National Film Board of Canada 1967 - director, writer, editor
Adventures - live-action short, National Film Board of Canada 1968 - director, writer, editor
Sir! Sir! - documentary short, National Film Board of Canada 1968 - director 
Mrs. Ryan’s Drama Class - documentary short, National Film Board of Canada 1969 - director
Sad Song of Yellow Skin - documentary, National Film Board of Canada/PBS 1970 - director, writer, editor 
Solomon’s Housing - documentary, National Film Board of Canada 1970 - director 
Here’s to Harry’s Grandfather - documentary, National Film Board of Canada 1970 - director 
Wet Earth and Warm People - documentary, National Film Board of Canada 1971 - director, writer, editor
Persistent and Finagling - documentary, National Film Board of Canada 1971 - director, writer, editor
Summer’s Nearly Over - documentary short, National Film Board of Canada 1971 - director and editor
Beware, Beware, My Beauty Fair - documentary short, Jean Lafleur and Peter Svatek, National Film Board of Canada 1972 - editor, producer
Cold Pizza - documentary short, Larry Kent, National Film Board of Canada 1972 - editor
OK…Camera - documentary short, National Film Board of Canada 1972 - director
The Streets of Saigon - documentary short, National Film Board of Canada 1973 - director, writer, editor
Jalan, Jalan: A Journey in Sundanese Java - documentary short, National Film Board of Canada 1973 - editor, writer, director
The Man Who Can’t Stop - documentary, National Film Board of Canada 1973 - director, writer, editor
Bate's Car: Sweet as a Nut - documentary short, Tony Ianzelo, National Film Board of Canada 1974 - producer
Waiting for Fidel - documentary, National Film Board of Canada 1974  - director, writer, editor, co-producer with Tom Daly
I Am an Old Tree - documentary, National Film Board of Canada 1975 - director, writer, editor, co-producer with Tom Daly
Temiscaming, Québec - documentary, Martin Duckworth, National Film Board of Canada 1975 - editor
River: Planet Earth – documentary short, Peter Raymont, National Film Board of Canada 1975 - writer, editor 
Log House - documentary short National Film Board of Canada 1976 - director, with Andreas Poulsson 
The Walls Come Tumbling Down - documentary short, National Film Board of Canada 1976 - director (with Pierre Lasry & William Weintraub), writer, editor
I Hate to Lose - documentary National Film Board of Canada 1977 - director, writer, editor
Tigers and Teddy Bears - documentary short, National Film Board of Canada 1978  - director, writer
Where Have All the Maoists Gone? - documentary, 1978 - director 
Solzhenitsyn’s Children…Are Making a Lot of Noise in Paris - documentary, National Film Board of Canada 1979 - director, writer, editor
Yes or No, Jean-Guy Moreau - documentary, National Film Board of Canada 1979 - director, writer
Daisy: The Story of a Facelift - documentary, National Film Board of Canada 1982 - director, writer, editor, co-producer with Kate Jansen
Not Far from Bolgatanga - documentary short, National Film Board of Canada 1982 -  writer, editor, co-producer and co-director with Barrie Howells
Margaret Atwood: Once in August - documentary, National Film Board of Canada 1984 - director, writer, editor, co-producer with Barrie Howells
Atwood and Family - documentary short, National Film Board of Canada 1985 - director, writer, co-producer with Barrie Howells
The Peanut Butter Solution - feature, Les Productions La Fête/Telefilm Canada 1985 - director, writer, producer 
Courage to Change - documentary, Tanya Ballantyne Tree, National Film Board of Canada 1986 - co-producer with Tanya Ballantyne Tree 
Tommy Tricker and the Stamp Traveller - feature, Les Productions La Fête/Telefilm Canada 1988 - director, writer  
Vincent and Me aka Vincent et Moi - feature, Les Productions La Fête/Telefilm Canada 1990 - director, writer 
Loggerheads - documentary, David Bradbury, Frontline Films 1990 - writer
The Return of Tommy Tricker - feature, Les Productions La Fête/Telefilm Canada 1994 - director, writer
No Place Like Home - documentary, Fiona Hergstrom, Living Pictures 1996 - producer
Final Insult - documentary, Ivan Hexter, Australian Broadcasting Corporation 1997 - producer
Brushes With Fame - documentary, Richard Mordaunt, Coolamon Films 1997 - producer
Uni - documentary series, Simon Target, Australian Broadcasting Corporation 1997 - producer
Race Around the World - documentary series, Australian Broadcasting Corporation 1997 - executive producer
Where Angels Fear to Tread - documentary, Nicola Woolmington, Annamax Media 1997 - executive producer
King’s School - documentary series, Simon Target, Australian Broadcasting Corporation 1998 - producer
Burden of Proof - documentary, David Goldie, Australian Broadcasting Corporation 1998 - producer
Love’s Tragedies - documentary, Don Parham, Parham Media Productions, 1998 - producer
To Get Rich is Glorious - documentary, Nick Torrens, Nick Torrens Film Productions 1998 - producer
Race Around the Corner - documentary series, Stephen G, Jones, Australian Broadcasting Corporation 1998 - producer
The Little Box That Sings - documentary, Australian Broadcasting Corporation 1999 - director, writer, producer
The Man Who’s Still Going - documentary, independent 1999 - director, writer, producer
Wamsley’s War - documentary, David Bradbury, Frontline Films 2000 - producer
Much Ado About Something - documentary, PBS/Australian Broadcasting Corporation 2001 - director, writer, producer
All About Olive - documentary, The Helpful Eye 2004 - director
Fond Memories of Cuba - documentary, David Bradbury, Frontline Films 2002 - writer, producer
Blowin’ in the Wind - documentary, David Bradbury, Frontline Films 2005 - writer
A Hard Rain - documentary, David Bradbury, Frontline Films 2007 - writer
The Guy from Cycle Chic - short film, The Helpful Eye 2009 - director, editor, producer
On Borrowed Time - documentary, David Bradbury, Frontline Films 2011 - writer
Michael Rubbo's Documentary Journey - instructive series, Michael Rubbo, Ellen Rubbo 2020

Awards

Mrs. Ryan's Drama Class 1969 (director)
 Conference on Children, Washington DC: Certificate of Merit, 1970

Sad Song of Yellow Skin (1970)
 24th British Academy Film Awards, London: BAFTA Award for Best Documentary, 1971
 Melbourne International Film Festival, Melbourne: Silver Boomerang, Best Film, 1971
 HEMISFILM, San Antonio TX: Best Film, 1971
 Festival of World Television, Los Angeles:  Best Documentary, 1971
 American Film and Video Festival, New York: Blue Ribbon Award, 1971
 American Film and Video Festival, New York: Emily Award, 1971
 22nd Canadian Film Awards: Special Award for Reportage, 1970
 Atlanta Film Festival: Gold Medal, Special Jury Award, 1971

Wet Earth and Warm People (1971)
 Golden Gate International Film Festival, San Francisco: Honourable Mention, Sociological Studies of Specific Groups or Lifestyles in a Society, 1972
 Atlanta Film Festival, Atlanta: Bronze Medal, Feature, 1972
 Melbourne International Film Festival, Melbourne: Diploma of Merit, 1972

The Man Who Can’t Stop (1973)
 Chicago International Film Festival, Chicago: Certificate of Merit, 1974

Waiting for Fidel (1974)
 American Film and Video Festival, New York: Red Ribbon, World Concerns, 1976

Bate’s Car: Sweet as a Nut (1974)
 Biofest, Novi Sad, Yugoslavia: Award of Merit, 1976

The Walls Come Tumbling Down (1976)
 American Film and Video Festival, New York: Blue Ribbon Award, Citizen Action, 1978

Where Have All the Maoists Gone? (1978)
 International Filmfestival Mannheim-Heidelberg, Mannheim, Germany: Interfilm Award, 1978

Solzhenitsyn’s Children…Are Making a Lot of Noise in Paris (1979)
 International Filmfestival Mannheim-Heidelberg, Mannheim, Germany: International Evangelical Award, 1979

Daisy: The Story of a Facelift (1982)
 Melbourne International Film Festival, Melbourne: Diploma of Merit, 1983
Uppsala International Short Film Festival, Uppsala, Sweden: Best Documentary Film, 1984
 American Film and Video Festival, New York: Blue Ribbon Award, Mental Health/Health/Guidance, 1984

The Peanut Butter Solution (1985)
 Giffoni Film Festival, Giffoni Valle Piana, Italy: Gold Medal, 1986
 Laon International Film Festival for Young People, Laon, France: Public's Choice Award, 1986

Vincent and Me 1990 
 Daytime Emmy Awards, New York: Outstanding Children's Special, 1991
 Wisconsin International Children's Film Festival, Milwaukee: WisKid Award, Full-Length Feature, 1991

References

1938 births
Australian activists
Australian expatriates in Canada
Australian film directors
Australian documentary filmmakers
Australian people of Italian descent
Harvard University faculty
Living people
Marlovian theory of Shakespeare authorship
National Film Board of Canada people
Shakespeare authorship theorists
Stanford University alumni
University of Sydney alumni